James Lee Duncan Carragher (born 28 January 1978) is an English football pundit and former footballer who played as a defender for Premier League club Liverpool during a career which spanned 17 years. A one-club man, he was Liverpool's vice-captain for 10 years, and is the club's second-longest ever serving player, making his 737th appearance for Liverpool in all competitions on 19 May 2013. Carragher also holds the record for the most appearances in European competition for Liverpool with 149.

Carragher started his career at the Liverpool Academy, making his professional debut in the 1996–97 season, and becoming a first team regular the following season. Having initially played as a full-back, the arrival of manager Rafael Benítez in 2004 saw Carragher move to become a centre-back, where he found his best form. His honours with Liverpool total two FA Cups, three League Cups, two Community Shields, one Champions League, one UEFA Cup, and two Super Cups.

Internationally, Carragher held the national record for most caps at under-21 level and earned his senior debut in 1999. He represented England at UEFA Euro 2004 and the 2006 FIFA World Cup, before announcing his retirement from international football in 2007. He did, however, temporarily come out of retirement in order to represent England at the 2010 FIFA World Cup, before retiring again with 38 senior England caps.

Following his retirement in 2013 Carragher joined Sky Sports, where he appears as a commentator and pundit. In July 2020, CBS Sports announced Carragher would join their Champions League studio broadcast team.

Club career

Beginnings and Cup treble (1988–2004)
Born in Bootle, Merseyside, Carragher attended the FA's school of excellence in Lilleshall in his youth. Although a childhood Everton supporter, he joined Merseyside rivals Liverpool in 1988, and regularly turned up at Liverpool's School of Excellence wearing a Graeme Sharp Everton kit.

Carragher's father was also an Everton supporter, and his two middle names (Lee Duncan) are a tribute to Gordon Lee and Duncan McKenzie – manager Lee dropped McKenzie on the day of Carragher's birth. He spent a year at the Everton School of Excellence at the age of 11, but returned to Liverpool due to the club's superior coaching set-up under Steve Heighway. He failed to impress in his first appearances to the Liverpool A and B teams due to his then-small stature, but after being moved from up front to a midfield role he was able to establish himself in the reserve team. He played his first game for the reserves in the 1994–95 season, and was named man of the match against Blackburn Rovers at Haig Avenue. He helped Liverpool to win the 1996 FA Youth Cup with a 4–1 aggregate victory over a West Ham United side that included Rio Ferdinand and Frank Lampard.

Carragher was tried out in defence for the first time during the tournament, and later admitted that Liverpool were not the most technically gifted side in the competition, but instead relied on team spirit and the outstanding talents of Michael Owen.

He made his first team debut for the "Reds" under Roy Evans in a League Cup quarter-final against Middlesbrough at the Riverside Stadium on 8 January 1997, coming on as a substitute for Rob Jones 75 minutes into a 2–1 defeat. Three days later he made his Premier League debut as a substitute at Anfield, playing the entire second half of a 0–0 draw with West Ham United. On 18 January, he was scheduled to play as a centre-half against Aston Villa, only to be replaced in the starting line-up by Bjørn Tore Kvarme; however Patrik Berger was taken ill and Carragher was his last minute replacement in central midfield. He played well alongside Jamie Redknapp and scored his first goal with a header in front of the Kop in a 3–0 win. Despite this auspicious start, it proved to be his last contribution to the 1996–97 campaign.

Carragher broke into the first team in the 1997–98 season as the team struggled to keep pace with Arsenal and Manchester United despite having talented players such as Owen, Redknapp, Robbie Fowler, Steve McManaman and Paul Ince. Throughout his early playing career, he was essentially used as a utility player that spent time as a centre-half, full-back and defensive midfielder in a squad that was often negatively labelled the "Spice Boys".

Carragher learned to shun the spotlight and focus on football instead as new manager Gérard Houllier used him consistently in a new continental side focused on discipline. In his autobiography, Carragher admitted that "I always felt close to Gérard", and was full of praise for the French manager during the early part of his reign. He went on to make 44 appearances in the 1998–99 season, and was named as the club's Player of the Year.

Carragher was restricted to the right-back position after scoring two own goals in a 3–2 home defeat to Manchester United early in the 1999–2000 season. Houllier never again played him at centre-back, as Sami Hyypiä and Stéphane Henchoz formed solid partnership.

The 2000–01 season saw Carragher switch to the left-back position and win his first senior honours, as Liverpool went on to win the FA Cup, League Cup, UEFA Cup, Community Shield and Super Cup in the space of just a few months.

During a January 2002 FA Cup tie against Arsenal, he threw a coin back into the stands that had been tossed at him and received a red card. He escaped an FA misconduct charge after publicly apologising, but he did receive a formal police warning about the incident.

From 2002 to 2004, Carragher was hit by two serious injuries, missing the 2002 FIFA World Cup for an operation on his knee, and later receiving a broken leg after a tackle by Blackburn Rovers' Lucas Neill at Ewood Park in September 2003. During this period, his place in the team was also threatened by signings of Steve Finnan and John Arne Riise. Despite this, he was able to win a second League Cup in 2003 with Liverpool, and shortly afterwards was named the club's vice-captain.

Champions League and FA Cup success (2004–2007)

The 2004–05 season proved to be a career-defining one for Carragher. New manager Rafael Benítez moved him to centre-half, where he would manage 56 appearances all season alongside Sami Hyypiä. Carragher developed a reputation as a strong and positionally astute defender and would remain in the centre-half position for the rest of his career.

This season saw Carragher prove central to Liverpool's triumph in the UEFA Champions League, in particular when he made two vital last-ditch intercepts in the Final in extra-time whilst suffering from cramp. Carragher was subsequently awarded the Liverpool Player of the Year Award at the end of the campaign, and went on to captain the team to their UEFA Super Cup victory over CSKA Moscow. Carragher was nominated for football's most prestigious individual accolade, the Ballon d'Or, in 2005.

In May 2006, Carragher played in the FA Cup Final against West Ham United, his tenth final in as many years of club football. Despite scoring an own goal in the 21st minute, Liverpool went on to win the Final 3–1 on penalties after the match finished 3–3 after extra-time, giving Carragher his second FA Cup win. He would appear in the FA Community Shield win two months later.

On 9 December 2006, Carragher scored his first league goal since January 1999, in a match against Fulham at Anfield. Fellow defender Daniel Agger flicked the ball on from a corner, and Carragher slid the ball under Fulham keeper Jan Laštůvka at the far post. The goal was only his fourth in his Liverpool career.

In Liverpool's Champions League semi-final second leg against Chelsea on 1 May 2007, Carragher set a new record for the most appearances in European competition for the club, his 90th European match taking him past Ian Callaghan's 89 matches between 1964 and 1978.

Carragher was voted as Liverpool's Player of the Year for a third time after the 2006–07 season by the fans, and immediately agreed a contract extension until 2011. That season also saw Carragher announce his international retirement, citing frustration with a lack of appearances under Steve McClaren.

Later Liverpool career (2007–2013)

The 2007–08 season saw Carragher reach his 500th appearance for Liverpool, for which he was made captain. On 18 May 2009, in the match against West Bromwich Albion, Carragher was involved in an on-field clash with fellow defender Álvaro Arbeloa, and the two had to be separated by teammates Xabi Alonso and Daniel Agger. Manager Rafael Benítez refused to comment on the matter, while Carragher later explained, "We want to keep a clean sheet and we want Pepe to have a chance of the Golden Glove for the fourth season running."

The following season saw many questioning his performances and whether he should remain in the starting line-up, although a solid performance against Manchester United on 25 October 2009 silenced his critics. Four days later, he was sent off in a game against Fulham, which was his first red card in more than seven years.

On 4 September 2010, a mixture of Liverpool players past and present played an Everton XI in Carragher's charity fund-raising testimonial match. All proceeds from the game at Anfield went to local charities through Carragher's 23 Foundation. He scored a goal for each side as his Liverpool team beat Everton XI 4–1, first by scoring from the spot for the Reds before converting a penalty own goal for the club he had supported as a boy after the break.

On 24 October 2010, Carragher scored his seventh own goal in the Premier League. Weeks later, Carragher dislocated his shoulder in a 2–1 defeat to Tottenham Hotspur, the same game being his 450th Premier League appearance for Liverpool. He was out for around three months with the injury as it required surgery. He returned on 6 February against Chelsea.

On 24 February 2011, Carragher made his 137th European appearance in a match against Sparta Prague at Anfield, setting a new British record. On 17 April 2011, during a match against Arsenal at the Emirates Stadium, both Carragher and Jon Flanagan tried to head away the same ball, resulting in their heads colliding and Carragher being knocked out. After 6 minutes of treatment Carragher was stretchered off and replaced by Sotirios Kyrgiakos. Carragher recovered in time to make his 666th appearance for Liverpool days later, in 5–2 victory against Fulham. This appearance put Carragher second in the list of Liverpool's all-time appearance makers, behind only Ian Callaghan with 857 games. In 2012, Carragher won a third League Cup with Liverpool.

In the first game of the 2012–13 season, and the start of Brendan Rodgers' term as Liverpool manager, Carragher made his 700th appearance for Liverpool in a 1–0 victory in the Europa League third round qualifying tie against FC Gomel. Carragher often captained the side during the Europa League, and after a period of time only making league appearances as a substitute, he began to again earn a string of starting places.

Retirement

On 7 February 2013, Carragher announced that he would retire at the end of the season, stating "It has been a privilege and honour to represent this great club for as long as I have and I am immensely proud to have done so since I was 9."

On 9 March 2013, he played his 500th league game for Liverpool, in a 3–2 win over Tottenham Hotspur. On 19 May 2013, Carragher played his 737th and final game for Liverpool in a 1–0 win over Queens Park Rangers. Before the match, he was given a guard of honour and was presented with a special trophy commemorating his career by Steven Gerrard and Ian Callaghan. During the match, despite his sparse goal record, Carragher hit Robert Green's post with a 30-yard strike, before being substituted in the 87th minute to a standing ovation from both sets of fans and players.

Post-retirement activity
In 2009, Carragher set up the 23 Foundation, a charitable foundation with the stated aims of helping the youth of Merseyside. In 2010 he donated all the proceeds from his testimonial year to the charity which created an initial fund of £1 million.

In August 2015, Jamie Carragher visited "Carragher's", a pub dedicated to his career at Liverpool, on West 39th street, Manhattan, New York. It was revealed that Carragher would return to the pitch to play for England in Soccer Aid, a charity football match in aid of UNICEF, alongside Robbie Fowler.

In January 2018, Carragher visited Kingsway House, a shelter which had been set up for rough sleepers by Liverpool hotel firm Signature Living. He spent several hours talking to homeless residents and the volunteers and announced plans for a special charity football match featuring ex-Liverpool and ex-Everton players and celebrities.

Carragher has worked with Liverpool fan Andy Grant, a former Royal Marine who was hit by a bomb in Afghanistan at the age of 20 and subsequently had his right leg amputated, in helping to promote his story and his subsequent autobiography. Both men are from Bootle and Grant has said: "It's safe to say I never dreamed that at 30 I would be able to call on a mate and have him host a night of talking about my autobiography". In May 2018, Grant released his book 'You'll Never Walk'. Carragher was present at several of the book launches and provided the foreword for the book.

On 10 October 2018, Carragher joined the opening of Cotton Street shelter. The Cotton Street Project welcomes Liverpool's most vulnerable members of society to enjoy the shelter. Carragher said "What Lawrence is doing is fantastic. I am proud to give him and the Cotton Street Project my support. I'll be keeping in regular contact with those using the shelter and hopefully helping them to turn their lives around for the better."

International career
In 1996, Carragher made his first appearance for the England U21 side. Playing as a defensive midfielder, he became a regular for the team and was eventually made captain. By 2000, when he became ineligible for the team due to age, he had set the record for the most caps at this level with 27. This record was later eclipsed in 2007 by former Liverpool goalkeeper Scott Carson.

On 28 April 1999 he earned his first cap for the senior England team, coming on as a substitute against Hungary. He made his full international début against Netherlands at White Hart Lane in 2001, and later came on as a substitute in England's famous 5–1 victory over Germany in the Olympiastadion. Carragher missed the 2002 FIFA World Cup to undergo surgery on a knee injury; though he had the option to delay surgery this would have required him to miss pre-season training with Liverpool.

He was selected for UEFA Euro 2004 but did not play a game, Ledley King being preferred in his position. He was later selected for the 2006 FIFA World Cup, and although not in the original starting eleven, he replaced Gary Neville who suffered an injury.

Carragher was one of three players to have a penalty saved by Portugal's Ricardo, as England yet again succumbed to a penalty shoot-out exit in the quarter-finals. Carragher, who had been brought on as a substitute for Aaron Lennon late in the game, scored with his first attempt but was forced to re-take his penalty by the referee Horacio Elizondo who had not blown his whistle. His shot hit the bar from the follow-up attempt.

During a Euro 2008 qualifier, against Israel, in Tel Aviv, Carragher hit the bar with a looping header as the match ended goalless.

On 9 July 2007 it was reported that Carragher was considering retiring from the England squad. When Talksport host Adrian Durham accused Carragher of "bottling it" on his programme, Carragher phoned in to defend himself and say that as he was not being regularly selected he was indeed thinking about retirement, but would leave it until the upcoming match against Germany to decide. Carragher did subsequently retire from international football, although he left open the possibility to return if needed for an international tournament. In his autobiography, he stated a number of reasons for his retirement: he prioritized Liverpool over England, he wanted to spend more time with his family, and most of all he was unwilling to feature as a squad player.

On 11 May 2010, it was announced that Carragher had been named in Fabio Capello's preliminary 30-man squad for the 2010 FIFA World Cup. Carragher said of his return to international football, "The FA got in touch a few weeks ago and asked if I would have a rethink, due to injury problems; I said I would make myself available."

On 24 May, Carragher played his first match for England in three years, a friendly against Mexico which England won 3–1. Carragher appeared in both of England's opening World Cup games, receiving a booking in each which resulted in a one-match ban. He was not selected for the knock-out stage exit at the hands of Germany, being dropped in favour of Matthew Upson. Carragher subsequently permanently retired from international football, stating that his international return had been a "one-off" due to injuries to other players.

Style of play

Carragher played as an attacking midfielder in his early days at Anfield and had been a striker as a child, but he soon learned the art of defending. He was able to play across the back four, often playing as a utility full back on either flank, and occasionally in the centre of midfield early in his Liverpool career but went on to spend most of his time at club and country level at centre-back. When playing at full back Carragher was sometimes labelled as a "limited defender" as he compared unfavourably with attacking full-backs due to his lack of pace or notable technical skills.

However, as a centre back he came into his own, and came to be regarded as one of the best English and Premier League defenders of his generation. A strong, versatile and consistent old-fashioned centre-back, who was known in particular for his work-rate, stamina, loyalty, leadership and commitment, as well as his courageous, no-nonsense and hard-tackling playing style, Carragher was gifted with organisational ability, intelligence, concentration, and tactical awareness, which enabled him to excel at reading the game, chase down opponents, and produce last-ditch tackles.

Former teammate Jamie Redknapp described him as "ultra competitive and probably the most driven footballer I have ever met". Carragher was named by Didier Drogba as the toughest opponent he had ever played against with the Ivorian describing him as an aggressive but fair defender.

In addition to his defensive skills, Carragher was also known for his longevity.

Media career
Carragher signed a contract with Sky Sports for the 2013/14 season to appear as a pundit alongside Graeme Souness, Gary Neville and Jamie Redknapp. Carragher appeared on Monday Night Football on Sky Sports alongside Gary Neville with presenter Ed Chamberlin from 2013 to 2016. Carragher and Neville were praised for their analysis, with their former on-field rivalry adding to their personalities on-air.

Carragher is an occasional sports columnist for the Daily Mail. In January 2014 the Daily Mail struck a partnership deal with TalkSPORT radio which saw Mail journalists and columnists, including Carragher, appear as guests on the station. 

In August 2017, TV3 Sport, the Danish Sports Channel (owned by Modern Times Group) signed Carragher as its new football expert. Carragher provides expert live analysis of the UEFA Champions League.

On 11 October 2017, Carragher was unveiled as The Telegraphs new football columnist. In June 2018 he joined its team of expert commentators to cover the World Cup in Russia. He also featured in The Telegraphs Total Football podcast throughout the tournament.

On 11 March 2018, the Daily Mirror published a video showing Carragher spitting at a car carrying a man and 14-year-old girl after covering Manchester United's 2–1 win over Liverpool for Sky. The man driving the vehicle "goaded" Carragher, shouting "Unlucky Jamie lad. Two, one." After the video surfaced, Carragher issued an apology to the driver and his daughter, calling it a "moment of madness" and the "worst mistake" of his career. He was suspended by Sky Sports and removed from Danish channel TV3 Sport's upcoming coverage the following day. He returned to TV3 Sport in early April 2018. Peter Norrelund, CEO of Modern Times Group issued a statement, saying "I do not think that a single mistake should have such serious consequences that we can no longer have Jamie Carragher on the team. Therefore, he is back on the football field for TV3 when quarter-finals are played in early April." Carragher made a brief appearance on Sky Sports in July, giving an interview following England's World Cup semi-final defeat to Croatia, before resuming his role as a football pundit in August 2018 for the start of the 2018–19 Premier League season.

Carragher also works with Soccer on CBS Sports.

Personal life

Carragher married his childhood sweetheart, Nicola Hart, in 2005 and they have two children. His son, James, is also a professional footballer currently playing for Wigan Athletic. Carragher was awarded the Freedom of the Borough of Sefton for his local charity work and "the exceptional example he sets to the youth of today" in 2008. He occasionally visits schools as part of his charity work, promoting the importance of family life.

Politically, Carragher is a supporter of the Labour Party and endorsed Andy Burnham in his leadership election in 2010. His autobiography, Carra, was released in 2008. Carragher has become a patron to the Alder Hey Charity.

On 8 April 2020, during the COVID-19 pandemic in Malta, in a message of encouragement to the nation, Carragher revealed that he had Maltese descent through his Maltese-born grandfather Paul Vassallo.

Career statistics

Club

International

Honours

Liverpool Youth
FA Youth Cup: 1995–96

Liverpool
FA Cup: 2000–01, 2005–06; runner-up: 2011-12
League Cup: 2000–01, 2002–03, 2011–12; runner-up: 2004-05
FA Community Shield: 2001, 2006; runner-up: 2002
UEFA Champions League: 2004–05; runner-up 2006-07
UEFA Cup: 2000–01
UEFA Super Cup: 2001, 2005
FIFA Club World Championship runner-up: 2005

Individual
PFA Premier League Team of the Year: 2005–06
Liverpool Player of the Season Award: 1999, 2005
Freedom of the Metropolitan Borough of Sefton: 23 January 2006.
 Honorary Fellowship from Liverpool John Moores University: July 2012.

See also
List of one-club men

References

Bibliography

External links

 
 
 LFC History Profile

1978 births
Living people
Sportspeople from Bootle
Footballers from Merseyside
English footballers
Association football defenders
Liverpool F.C. players
Premier League players
UEFA Cup winning players
UEFA Champions League winning players
England youth international footballers
England under-21 international footballers
England B international footballers
England international footballers
UEFA Euro 2004 players
2006 FIFA World Cup players
2010 FIFA World Cup players
English association football commentators
English people of Maltese descent
Labour Party (UK) people
FA Cup Final players
English autobiographers
Daily Mail journalists